The women's long jump was one of two women's jumping events on the Athletics at the 1964 Summer Olympics program in Tokyo.  It was held on 14 October 1964.  32 athletes from 20 nations entered, with 1 not starting in the qualification round.

Results

Qualification

The qualification standard was 6.00 metres.  Each jumper had three opportunities.

Final

References

Athletics at the 1964 Summer Olympics
Long jump at the Olympics
1964 in women's athletics
Women's events at the 1964 Summer Olympics